Worton may refer to:

People
Alf Worton (1914-2000), English footballer
Dan Worton (born 1972), English musician
Harry Worton (1921-2002), Canadian politician
Michael Worton (born 1951), Scottish academic based at University College London
Ronald Worton (born 1942), Canadian doctor
William A. Worton (1897-1973), American police chief

Places
United Kingdom
Worton, North Yorkshire
Worton, Oxfordshire (disambiguation)
Worton, Wiltshire

United States
Worton, Maryland